Collix foraminata is a moth in the  family Geometridae. It is found on the Comoros and Madagascar, as well as in Cameroon, Kenya, South Africa, Tanzania and Uganda.

References

Moths described in 1857
foraminata
Moths of Africa
Moths of Madagascar